First Presbyterian Church, now known as Primera Iglesia Bautista (First Baptist Church), is a historic Christian church building on Fannin and 3rd Streets in Van Horn, Texas.

The Carpenter Gothic-style church building was constructed in 1901. It was added to the National Register of Historic Places in 1978. As of 2013, the church is known as Primera Iglesia Bautista (First Baptist Church). The congregation offers Sunday services in Spanish at 11 a.m. and Wednesday evening prayer meetings at 7 p.m.

See also

National Register of Historic Places listings in Culberson County, Texas

References

Presbyterian churches in Texas
Baptist churches in Texas
Churches completed in 1901
20th-century Presbyterian church buildings in the United States
Buildings and structures in Culberson County, Texas
Churches on the National Register of Historic Places in Texas
National Register of Historic Places in Culberson County, Texas
Recorded Texas Historic Landmarks